Cephalia flavoscutellata is a species of ulidiid or picture-winged fly in the genus Cephalia of the family Ulidiidae.

Distribution
Europe, North America.

References

Ulidiidae
Diptera of North America
Diptera of Europe
Taxa named by Theodor Becker
Insects described in 1900